Asamiya may refer to:

 Assamese language, a language of India
 Assamese people
 Kia Asamiya, Japanese manga artist
 Athena Asamiya, a fictional character

See also 
 Asamia, a genus of beetles
 Assamia, a genus of harvestmen in the family Assamiidae